A lavalier or lavaliere or lavalliere is an item of jewelry consisting of a pendant, sometimes with one stone, pendulous and centered from a necklace.

The style was popularized by the Duchesse de la Vallière, a mistress of King Louis XIV of France. A lavalier can be recognized most for its drop, usually consisting of a stone and/or a chandelier pendant, which is attached directly to the chain, not by a bail.

According to Hans Nadelhoffer, Cartier: Jewelers Extraordinary (1984), p. 50:

"Lavallière" is still the French name for a pussy bow.

Later, the American collegiate fraternity system ("greeks") adopted a lavalier which contained the fraternity letters as part of or within the pendant to symbolize involvement in an ongoing romantic relationship.  Women receiving these pendants were called "dropped," but may later enter a long-term relationship resulting in becoming "pinned" (woman receiving the man's fraternity pin to wear), engaged and married.

See also
College and university dating

References

Necklaces